Danielle Remilekum B. Alakija, also known simply as Danni Alakija (born 3 May 1996) is a British-born Fijian athlete of Nigerian descent. She trains in the United States and was part of the silver medal-winning 4 × 400 m relay team at the 2011 Pacific Games. She was selected to compete for Fiji at the 2012 Summer Olympics, and was the Olympic's youngest track and field competitor.

Achievements

References

External links
Sports reference biography

1996 births
Living people
Fijian female sprinters
Athletes from London
Olympic athletes of Fiji
Athletes (track and field) at the 2012 Summer Olympics
British emigrants to Fiji
Fijian people of Nigerian descent
Olympic female sprinters